Fa'ausu Afoa (born 29 June 1967) is a Samoan former professional rugby league footballer  who played in the 1990s for the Penrith Panthers and North Harbour Sea Eagles, and for Western Samoa.

Background
Afoa was born in Apia, Samoa.

Career
He played for the New Zealand XIII side in the 1997 Oceania Cup.

References

External links
Fa'ausu Afoa's profile at Yesterday's Hero

1967 births
Living people
Auckland rugby league team players
Bradford Bulls players
Expatriate rugby league players in Australia
North Harbour rugby league team players
Northcote Tigers players
Penrith Panthers players
Rugby league props
Rugby league second-rows
Samoa national rugby league team players
Samoan emigrants to New Zealand
Samoan expatriate rugby league players
Samoan expatriate sportspeople in Australia
Samoan rugby league players
Sportspeople from Apia